Dirty Dancing is a 1987 film.

Dirty Dancing may also refer to:

 Dirty Dancing (1988 TV series), an American television series that aired on CBS
 Dirty Dancing (2006 TV series), an American reality series that aired on WE tv network
 Dirty Dancing (2017 film), a musical television remake of the 1987 film
 Dirty Dancing (album), by Swayzak
 "Dirty Dancing" (song), by New Kids On The Block
 Dirty Dancing (soundtrack), soundtrack to the 1987 film
 Dirty Dancing: Havana Nights (also known as Dirty Dancing 2 or Dirty Dancing 2: Havana Nights), a 2004 film
 Dirty Dancing: The Classic Story on Stage, a stage musical
 Dirty Dancing: The Time of Your Life, a UK TV series